Wang Guan (died November or December 260), courtesy name Weitai, was a Chinese politician of the state of Cao Wei during the Three Kingdoms period of China.

Life
Wang Guan lost his parents early.

Cao Cao summoned him to serve as a Writing Assistant in the Imperial Chancellor's office. Later, he was reassigned to serve as the County Prefect of Gaotang, Yangquan, Zan and Ren counties.

When Cao Pi ascended the throne, Wang Guan was recalled to the capital to serve as a Gentleman of Writing and Supervising Judge. Afterwards, he was appointed as the Administrator of Nanyang and Zhuo commanderies. There he built a reputation of defending local people from invasions by Xianbei tribes.

When a government inspector came to check the state of his administration, Wang Guan volunteered to degrade his grade on the ground that his region was under the threat of the Xianbei, and endured the penalty of sending his own child to the capital as a hostage. Before long, he entered the capital and became a judge presiding over trials.

When Cao Fang ascended the throne, although Cao Shuang wielded absolute authority, Wang Guan enforced laws with rigour so that Wang Guan confronted Cao Shuang's associates several times. As Cao Shuang felt uncomfortable with Wang Guan for this reason, he demoted Wang Guan to Minister Coachman.

When Sima Yi launched a coup in 249, Wang Guan participated the coup by becoming a temporary general, the Central Commander of the Army, the position of Cao Xi. After Cao Shuang was executed, Wang Guan received the title of a Secondary Marquis and was appointed as a Master of Writing and Chief Commandant of Escorting Cavalry.

In 254, Cao Fang was deposed. Wang Guan was promoted to Marquis of Zhongxiang Village and made a Household Counsellor and Left Supervisor of the Masters of Writing.

In 260, Cao Mao was killed and Cao Huan ascended the throne. Wang Guan was enfeoffed as the Marquis of Yang District and appointed as Minister of Works. He died several months later.

See also
 Lists of people of the Three Kingdoms

References

 Chen, Shou (3rd century). Records of Three Kingdoms (Sanguozhi).
 Pei, Songzhi (5th century). Annotations to Records of the Three Kingdoms (Sanguozhi zhu).
Guang, Sima (11th century). Comprehensive Mirror in Aid of Governance (Zizhi Tongjian Guangmu).

Year of birth unknown
260 deaths
Cao Wei politicians
Han dynasty politicians from Shandong
Officials under Cao Cao
Political office-holders in Henan
Political office-holders in Hebei
Politicians from Heze